Paipra (near Pezhakkappilly) is a small village in Muvattupuzha Taluka of Ernakulam district of Kerala state, south India.

Location
Paipra is located at the centre of a triangle formed by four medium-sized towns: Muvattupuzha, Banttaraptzhu Perumbavoor and Kothamangalam.

Paipra is a central point in, and an industrial area of, the growing town of Muvattupuzha. It has a variety of political parties. Its main agricultural activities are pineapple, rubber, and tapioca.

References 

Villages in Ernakulam district